This was the first edition of the tournament.

Danka Kovinić won the title, defeating Irina-Camelia Begu in the final, 6–4, 3–6, 6–3.

Seeds

Draw

Finals

Top half

Bottom half

References

Main Draw

Kiskút Open II - Singles